Galva is a city in Henry County, Illinois, United States. The population was 2,589 at the 2010 census, down from 2,758 in 2000.

History
Cousins William L. Wiley (1820-1900)  and James Wiley (1817-1886) founded  Galva in 1854. The name Galva honors the Swedish immigrants of nearby Bishop Hill and refers to Gävle, Sweden which is the town's sister city.  Today around 80% of the town has Scandinavian ancestry.

Galva was a railroad town. Galva was laid out along the  Chicago, Burlington and Quincy Railroad  (Burlington Route) with the help of Bishop Hill trustees who invested heavily in Galva. This was the first of three rail lines to locate there.   This group was formed in 1852  and ran a line from Aurora, Illinois to Galesburg, Illinois. A second branch of the Burlington Route later also came through. Later the Peoria and Rock Island Railroad (Rock Island Railroad)  came through Galva.

Geography

Climate

Demographics

As of the 2000 census, there were 2,758 people, 1,164 households, and 740 families residing in the city. The racial makeup of the city was 98.59% White, 0.25% African American, 0.22% Native American, 0.11% Asian, 0.33% from other races, and 0.51% from two or more races. Hispanic or Latino of any race were 1.96% of the population.

There were 1,164 households, out of which 28.8% had children under the age of 18 living with them, 51.9% were married couples living together, 8.9% had a female householder with no husband present, and 36.4% were non-families. 32.8% of all households were made up of individuals, and 19.0% had someone living alone who was 65 years of age or older.  The average household size was 2.37 and the average family size was 3.01.

In the city, the population was spread out, with 24.7% under the age of 18, 7.8% from 18 to 24, 25.7% from 25 to 44, 22.8% from 45 to 64, and 19.0% who were 65 years of age or older.  The median age was 39 years. For every 100 females, there were 89.3 males.  For every 100 females age 18 and over, there were 85.9 males.

The median income for a household in the city was $35,071, and the median income for a family was $45,880. Males had a median income of $31,467 versus $21,714 for females. The per capita income for the city was $17,165.  About 6.9% of families and 7.2% of the population were below the poverty line, including 11.3% of those under age 18 and 4.5% of those age 65 or over.

2010 Census
According to the 2020 census, the city had a population of 2,470.  Of this, 2,503 (96.68%) were White, 32 (1.24%) were two or more races, 26 (1.00%) were Black or African American, 15 (0.58%) were some other race, 11 (0.42%) were Asian, and 2 (0.08%) were American Indian or Alaska Native.  80 (3.09%) were Hispanic or Latino (of any race)

Education

Higher education
Black Hawk College, a community college, has one of its campus in the town.

Community organizations
 Galva Arts Council
 Galva American Legion Post #45

Notable people
Reuben Beals, Illinois state representative, farmer, and carpenter.
Rich Falk, professional basketball player.
Rollin Kirby, a political cartoonist and three-time winner of the Pulitzer Prize.

References

External links
 City of Galva official website

Cities in Illinois
Cities in Henry County, Illinois
Swedish-American culture in Illinois
Populated places established in 1854
1854 establishments in Illinois